La troupe du Roi de Suede, or Roi de Suede for short, was a French-speaking Swedish court theater, active at the Royal Swedish court from 1699 until 1706.

The Roi de Suede was engaged by Charles XII of Sweden because a French language court theater was regarded to be a compulsory thing in the representational life of a royal court at the time. Its leader was Rosidor fils, and commonly, the company have therefore been referred to as simply "The Rosidor Troupe". The company performed both spoken drama, opera and ballet, and was regarded to have upheld a high quality. The performances were staged at the residences of the royal court, as well as in the Bollhuset in Stockholm.

The Great Northern War in 1700 caused financial difficulties for the court theater. The queen dowager would not allow the troupe to perform at court after the king had left to serve in the war. The king therefore gave permission to the Roi de Suede to perform at Bollhuset for the public in the city of Stockholm, and ordered the royal court to visit the performances there. From February 1700, they performed in public. Because of the language barrier, these were not a success among the majority of the public. They also arranged public masquerades with card gambling at Bollhuset, which evidently became popular, though also ill reputed. On at least one occasion, at Thorn in 1703, the troupe, or a part of it, traveled to perform for Charles XII during his war service.

In 1703, several of the members of the troupe left when the contract was no longer renewed because of costs. A smaller part of the troupe, however, remained, acquired a second contract in 1704, and continued the activity in Stockholm until the end term of the second contract in 1706.

Members
 Marie Anne Aubert, singer
 Jean Francois Bénard, dancer
 J.B. de Crous, musician
 Gillette Boutelvier-Duchemin, d. 1765
 Jean Pierre Duchemin, 1674–1754
 Antoine Dupré, dancer
 Francoise Fabe-Picard, dancer
 Claude Guilmois de Rosidor, director
 Marianne Guillemay du Chesnay Bérge de Rosidor
 Robert Lemoine de la France, musician
 Henri de la Motte, musician
 Louis Picard, dancer
 Jacques Rénot, musician
 Marie Trouche-du Chesnay-de Rosidor, d. 1705.
 Paul Belleville de Foy, 1699-1700
 Chantreau, 1703
 Charles Gourlin dit Roselis, 1699-1700
 M. François de la Traverse, sieur de Sévigny (1658 - 1715), 1700-1706
 Catherine Lenuque, épouse Toubel, 1699-1701
 Marie Longueil La Roque, 1702
 Charles-Louis Pallai Versigny, 1700
 Jacques Sarabat dit La Rocque
 François Toubel, 1699-1702

See also
 La troupe du Roi de Danemark
 Du Londel Troupe

References
 
 Tryggve Byström (1981). Svenska komedien 1737-1754. Borås: Centraltryckeriet AB. 
 Lars Löfgren (2003). Svensk teater. Stockholm: Natur & Kultur. 
 Svensk Uppslagsbok (1947 år utgåva)
 
 
 
 Forser, Tomas & Heed, Sven Åke (red.), Ny svensk teaterhistoria. 1, Teater före 1800, Gidlund, Hedemora, 2007 
 

17th century in Sweden
17th-century theatre
18th century in Sweden
18th-century theatre
Swedish comedy troupes
Former theatres in Stockholm
1699 establishments in Sweden
1706 disestablishments in Europe
Theatre companies in Sweden
Swedish Empire